Politics of the Åland Islands takes place in a framework of a parliamentary representative democratic autonomous, demilitarised and unilingually Swedish territory of Finland, whereby the Lantråd is the head of government, and of a multi-party system.

The Åland Islands are governed according to the Act on Åland Autonomy and international treaties, which guarantees autonomy and demilitarized status. The Government of Åland, or Landskapsregering, is dependent on the Parliament of Åland, or Lagting, according to the principles of parliamentarism.

In 1634, Åland was made part of the Åbo and Björneborg County as a part of the grand administrative reforms initiated by count Axel Oxenstierna. The county became part of the Russian Empire within the Grand Duchy of Finland in 1809, when Sweden was forced to cede vast areas in the Napoleonic Wars. When Finland declared its independence in 1917, the newly established state inherited the Åland islands.

During the Civil War in 1918, some Russian troops were still stationed on the islands, causing serious instability and nervousness. This anxiety in the local population, and in the other Scandinavian states, resulted in a Swedish occupation and 7,135 people (of a total population of approximately 22,500 at the time) signing the address for Åland joining the kingdom of Sweden. The fear of Russia finally resulted in a German occupation of the islands. In the meantime, the Finnish press was playing with the idea of an exchange of land areas between Sweden and Finland. The areas in question of this exchange would have been the Swedish speaking Åland to Sweden and some Finnish speaking areas of Norrbotten and Västerbotten to Finland. The response from the Swedish government was bluntly negative to any exchanges of this nature.

Since the 1920s, the primary political issue in Åland Islands relates to the promotion and protection of the self-government of the islands. There is widespread political support for retaining self-government. The sovereignty over Åland belongs to Finland, and Åland is thus not independent. The Åland Islands are guaranteed representation in the Finnish parliament, and elect one representative.

In 1921 the question of Åland was brought to the council of League of Nations. The council decided unanimously, that the islands would remain under Finland's sovereignty, but stated that the native population's rights to their own language had to be preserved, that the area had to stay demilitarized and that Åland was granted autonomy during peacetime.

Åland has its own national flag, has issued its own postage stamps since 1984, has its own police force, and is a member of the Nordic Council. The islands are demilitarised, and the male population is exempted from conscription. Parliamentarism has been the custom since 1988. The Åland autonomy preceded the creation of the Regions of Finland, but the autonomous government of Åland also handles what the regional councils do.

Until the late 1970s, Åland politics was predominantly personalised, as politics was oriented around notable individuals. In the late 1970s, a party system developed. The prominent parties in Åland since 1979 are the Social Democrats, Centre, Liberals, and Moderates. In comparison to the other Nordic countries, the political left is weak in Åland.

Executive branch

!align=left|Lantråd
|Katrin Sjögren
|Lib
|2015
|-
|Other Government parties
|
|MSÅ, ÅS
|
|}
In addition to Åland's own government, the Government of Åland (Ålands Landskapsregering), there is also a State Department of Åland (Statens ämbetsverk på Åland), headed by the Governor, Peter Lindbäck, and which is a department of the Government of Finland concerned with its functions in the islands.

Legislative branch
The Parliament of Åland (Lagtinget, which means Law Thing) has 30 members, elected for a four-year term by proportional representation.

Political parties and elections

Local government
Municipalities of Åland, or Kommuner

See also
Politics of Finland
Ting
Swedish Assembly of Finland, or Folktinget

References

External links
   – Official site
 Landskapsregeringen – Official site
 Act on Åland Autonomy – at Lagtinget

Politics of Åland